Old Home Week or Old Home Day is a practice that originated in the New England region of the United States similar to a harvest holiday or festival.  In its beginning in the 19th–20th century it involved a municipal effort to invite former residents of a village, town, or city—usually individuals who grew up in the municipality as children and moved elsewhere in adulthood—to visit the "Old Home", the parental household and home town. Some municipalities celebrate the holiday annually, while others celebrate it every few years.

In the late 20th and early 21st century, the practice has spread to other parts of North America and has become a broader celebration with an emphasis on local culture and history. The Wilmington, Vermont town web site describes the event as follows:

References

External links
 Annals of Old Home Week 1901, for Pittsfield, New Hampshire
 
 Old Home Week a 1907 poem by James Ball Naylor with illustrations and photographs of Boston expressing the sentiments of Old Home Week

Awareness weeks in the United States
Canadian traditions
Unofficial observances
Festivals in the United States